John Tse Wing-ling (born 1954) is an associate professor in the Department of Applied Social Sciences, City University of Hong Kong .

He was the member of the Wan Chai District Council (1994–2007) representing Causeway Bay and elected as vice-chairman from 2004 to 2007. He was the also member of Legislative Council (1995–97) representing for Election Committee.

References

1954 births
Living people
Independent politicians in Hong Kong
District councillors of Wan Chai District
Democratic Party (Hong Kong) politicians
Academic staff of the City University of Hong Kong
Lakehead University alumni
University of Alberta alumni
Alumni of the University of Nottingham
HK LegCo Members 1995–1997
Members of the Election Committee of Hong Kong, 2017–2021